The Czech Brethren may refer to:

Evangelical Church of Czech Brethren, the biggest Czech Protestant church, founded 1918
Church of Brethren (Czech Republic), an evangelical free church in the Czech Republic
Moravian Church, a current church which evolved from Unity of the Brethren
Unity of the Brethren Baptists, an association serving Brethren Baptist Christians in the Czech Republic

See also
Unity of the Brethren (disambiguation)